Dudu is a District in the state of Rajasthan in Northern India. It has an average elevation of 377 m (1,237 ft).

According to the 2011 census Dudu has a population of 1,84,960 roughly equal to the nation of Samoa or the federal city of Bonn in Germany. The district has a population density of 203 per square kilometer. Its population growth rate over the decade 2001-2011 was 26.91%. Dudu has a sex ratio of 943 females for every 1000 males, and a literacy rate of 61.98%.

References

Cities and towns in Jaipur district
Tehsils of Rajasthan